Henry Smith VC (1825 – 18 August 1862) was an English recipient of the Victoria Cross, the highest and most prestigious award for gallantry in the face of the enemy that can be awarded to British and Commonwealth forces.

Details
Smith was about 32 years old, and a lance corporal in the 52nd (Oxfordshire) Regiment of Foot (later the Oxfordshire and Buckinghamshire Light Infantry), British Army during the Indian Mutiny when the following deed took place on 14 September 1857 at Delhi, India for which he was awarded the VC:

Further information
He later achieved the rank of sergeant, and died of cholera while serving in India. He was buried in a mass grave.

The medal
His Victoria Cross is displayed at the Royal Green Jackets (Rifles) Museum, Winchester, England.

References

Monuments to Courage (David Harvey, 1999)
The Register of the Victoria Cross (This England, 1997)

1825 births
1862 deaths
52nd Regiment of Foot soldiers
British recipients of the Victoria Cross
Indian Rebellion of 1857 recipients of the Victoria Cross
People from Thames Ditton
Deaths from cholera
Infectious disease deaths in India
British Army recipients of the Victoria Cross
Military personnel from Surrey
Burials in India